{{DISPLAYTITLE:Tau4 Serpentis}}

Tau4 Serpentis, Latinized from τ4 Serpentis, is a variable M-type giant star in the constellation of Serpens, approximately 710 light-years from the Earth.

With a spectral classification M5IIIa, Tau4 Serpentis is a cool red giant star.  The spectrum varies, and some sources classify it between M4IIIe and M6IIIe.  Some of its spectral lines show an inverse P Cygni profile, where cold infalling gas on to the star creates redshifted hydrogen absorption lines next to the normal emission lines.  It is classified as a semiregular late-type variable, and its magnitude varies between +5.89 and +7.07 with a period of approximately 100 days.

τ4 is unique among the stars with the Bayer designation τ Serpentis as being the only one with no HR catalog number.

References

Serpens (constellation)
Semiregular variable stars
M-type giants
Serpentis, 17
Serpentis, Tau4
139216
076423
Durchmusterung objects
Asymptotic-giant-branch stars